Michael Rodd (born 19 January 1982 in Manly, New South Wales) is an Australian jockey who is best known for riding Efficient to victory in the 2007 Melbourne Cup.

Rodd has also been successful in the 2008 Cox Plate, riding Maldivian and in the 2006 Victoria Derby, again riding Efficient. He began racing in 2000. As of mid-May 2021 he has ridden 1,226 winners, including 33 in Group One races.

References

External links
Official website

Australian jockeys
Sportsmen from New South Wales
Living people
1982 births
21st-century Australian people